Megan Jones (born 6 November 1976) is one of Australia's top event riders, a Silver Medalist at the 2008 Beijing Olympic Games.

Jones began riding at the age of 5, continued through her early years in Pony Club before hitting the international scene in 2003 at the World Cup Final. In 2005, she won Melbourne International Three Day Event riding three star on Kirby Park Irish Jester, then later in the same year won the four star at the 2005 Adelaide Horse Trials on the same mount and a second in the two star competition on another. Chosen to compete in the 2006 World Equestrian Games, she was on the bronze medal winning Australian Event Team, and finished 16th individually.

Jones won a silver medal in Beijing in 2008 riding Kirby Park Irish Jester in the team event, alongside countrymen Clayton Fredericks, his wife Lucinda Fredericks, Shane Rose and Sonja Johnson.

Jones owns Kirby Park Stud, in Hahndorf in the Adelaide hills. Along with Kirby Park Irish Jester and Kirby Park Irish Hallmark, her top horses have included Kirby Park Allofasudden, which was selected as a reserve in Beijing.

References

http://www.chronofhorse.com/article/megan-jones-and-kirby-park-irish-jester-withdraw-weg

External links
www.kirbypark.com
Megan Jones's Blog

Australian event riders
Australian female equestrians
Equestrians at the 2008 Summer Olympics
Olympic equestrians of Australia
Olympic silver medalists for Australia
Living people
1976 births
Place of birth missing (living people)
Olympic medalists in equestrian
Medalists at the 2008 Summer Olympics